Grupa Marina Škrgatića (transl. Marin Škrgatić Band) was a Yugoslav progressive rock band formed in Zagreb in 1970. Fronted by vocalist and trombonist Marin Škrgatić, the group was a prominent act of the 1970s Yugoslav rock scene.

Band history

1970 – mid-1970s
The band was formed in 1970 in Zagreb. The forming members of the band were Marin Škrgatić (formerly of Soul Soul Band, vocals and trombone), Mladen Leib (guitar, bassoon), Branko Kezele (bass guitar, clarinet), Dragan Brčić (drums, viola) and Miro Matošević (percussion, oboe). During the following years Rajko Dujmić (organ, electric violin), Vladimir Georgev (bass guitar) and Hrvoje Galeković (drums) also performed with the band.

Soon after the formation the band attracted the attention of the audience and the media with their avant-garde approach to rock music. Only several months after the formation, they got the opportunity to make recordings for Radio Zagreb. During the early 1970s they presented themselves to the audience in major centers of Yugoslav rock scene: in Ljubljana ( with drummer Dario Orioli who changed their official drummer just for that performance 1973, and they performed on the initial editions of BOOM Festival). In Belgrade they performed on the concerts organized by Pop Mašina in Belgrade Sports Hall, and in Zagreb they held regular club performances. In 1973 the band released their debut record, the 7-inch single with the songs "Beži Janke" ("Get Away, Janke") and "Vjeruj" ("Believe") through Suzy record label. In 1974 they released two more single records, both through Jugoton record label: the first one featured the songs "Rokoko" ("Rococo") and "Čežnja" ("Longing"), and the second one featured the songs "Tina" and "Budi tu" ("Be There").

In 1975 Škrgatić took part in the Rock Fest '75, the gathering of the most popular Yugoslav singers of the time; besides Škrgatić, the event featured Željko Bebek (of Bijelo Dugme), Mato Došen (of Hobo), Aki Rahimovski (of Parni Valjak), Seid Memić "Vajta" (of Teška Industrija), Boris Aranđelović (of Smak), Hrvoje Marjanović (of Grupa 220), Dado Topić (of Time) and Janez Bončina "Benč" (of September). After the event, the band quietly ended their activity. Škrgatić made his last discographic appearance in 1979, recording the EP 20 godina ORA Sava (20 Years of Youth Work Action Sava) with the band Stakleno Zvono (Bell Jar), retiring from the scene soon after.

Discography

Singles
"Beži Janke" / "Vjeruj" (1973)
"Rokoko" / "Čežnja" (1974)
"Tina" / "Budi tu" (1974)

References

External links
Grupa Marina Škrgatića at Discogs

Croatian progressive rock groups
Yugoslav progressive rock groups
Musical groups established in 1970